Thomas Robert Daley  (born 21 May 1994) is a British diver and television personality. Specialising in multiple events, he is an Olympic gold medallist in the men's synchronised 10-metre platform event at the 2020 Olympics and double world champion in the FINA 10-metre platform event, winning in 2009 at the age of fifteen, and again in 2017. He is an Olympic bronze medallist in the 2012 platform event, the 2016 synchronised event, and the 2020 platform event, making him the first British diver to win four Olympic medals. Daley also competes in team events, winning the inaugural mixed team World title in 2015. He is a one-time Olympic champion, 3-time World Champion, a 2-time junior World Champion, a 5-time European champion and 4-time Commonwealth champion.

Daley started diving at the age of seven and is a member of Plymouth Diving Club, where his talent was identified early, and made an impact in national and international competitions from age nine. He represented Great Britain at the 2008 Summer Olympics where he was Britain's youngest competitor, age fourteen, and the youngest from any nation to participate in a final. In 2009, Daley reached a career-best ranking of number one in the FINA World Aquatics Championships Diving Rankings for the 10 m platform. He won two gold medals for England at the 2010 Commonwealth Games, in the 10 m synchro diving (with Max Brick) and the 10 m Individual Platform competition.

After the 2012 Summer Olympics and a summer of increased sporting interest amongst the UK public, television network ITV approached Daley to have a role in their new celebrity diving reality TV show Splash! Daley made his debut in the show's premiere on 5 January 2013 as a mentor to the celebrity competitors taking part.

Early life
Daley was born on 21 May 1994 at Derriford Hospital in Plymouth, Devon, England, the son of Debbie (née Selvester) and Robert Daley. He has two brothers – William who is three years younger, and Ben who is five years younger. Their father, Robert, died from a brain tumour on 27 May 2011, aged 40, a few days after Daley's 17th birthday. His early diving hero was Canadian diver Alexandre Despatie, who won gold at the 1998 Commonwealth Games at the age of 13, and British diver Leon Taylor, who later mentored him.
Daley was spotted by a coach, taking part in regular diving lessons, and was placed in a competitive squad in September 2002. His first competition was the National Novice Championships in April 2003 where he won a medal in the 8/9-year-old boys category. In September 2003, he took part in an invitational event in Southampton where he won the 1 m, 3 m and platform events, and first made his mark on the wider audience. Daley won his age group at the British Championships in the 1 m springboard, the 3 m springboard, and platform in 2004, 2005, and 2006.

In June 2004, the month after his tenth birthday, he won the platform competition in the National Junior (under-18) group, making him the youngest winner of that event. In 2005 Daley competed as a guest competitor in the Australian Elite Junior Nationals and placed first in platform and second in 3 m springboard in the 14–15 age group event. He also competed in the 14–15 category at the 2005 Aachen Junior International, placing second in platform and third in 3 m springboard. He met the qualification standard for the 2006 Commonwealth Games, but was not selected for the England team because of his age. In 2006, he was the under-18 British champion in platform and 3m springboard, and he placed second in the 10 m platform at the 2007 senior British Championships, which were held in December 2006.

Education
From age 11 to 14 Daley attended Eggbuckland Community College in Plymouth, Devon. At 13 he became a celebrity supporter of Childline, a children's helpline run by the National Society for the Prevention of Cruelty to Children (NSPCC), and at that time it was revealed that he had been bullied eighteen months earlier. In April 2009, Daley alleged to Plymouth's main local newspaper The Herald that he had been bullied at school since the Olympics, and his father told the BBC that he had temporarily withdrawn him from that school because its response to the problem had been ineffective. Daley was praised in the media for speaking out about his problem.

Daley was offered a full scholarship to board at independent school Brighton College, but his father turned this down due to the distance from home, and entered negotiations with local independent school Plymouth College, which had offered him a "very significant scholarship". A few weeks later it was confirmed that Daley had enrolled at Plymouth College.

Daley took his GCSEs in small batches to fit around his diving commitments. He persuaded supermodel Kate Moss to pose for a recreation of an original portrait by David Hockney, as part of a GCSE photography project recreating great works of art, after meeting her on a photo shoot for the Italian version of Vogue. Daley obtained eight A* grades and one A in his GCSEs.

In 2012, Daley finished his two-year A-level studies in mathematics, Spanish and photography. Daley decided not to undertake an International Baccalaureate course because of the pressures he faced in his preparation for the 2012 Olympics. He received an A* in his Photography A-level, and an A in his Spanish and Maths A-levels.

International competitions

2007
In January 2007, at the age of twelve, Daley was given a special dispensation to compete at the 2007 Australian Youth Olympic Festival. The usual minimum age is fifteen. Competing with a persistent thumb injury, Daley won the silver medal with synchro-partner Callum Johnstone in the 10m synchronized-diving final.

Later in 2007, he won the senior platform title at the Amateur Swimming Association (ASA) National Championships, the national championship for English divers. In 2007 he also began to compete on International Swimming Federation's (FINA) international diving circuit of Grand Prix and World Series events, twice finishing fourth in individual competition.Daley won the 2007 BBC Sports Personality of the Year Young Personality award. He was considered a medal prospect for the 2012 Summer Olympics in London from this time, and was one of the British Olympians being tracked through the years leading up to London 2012 by the BBC television series Olympic Dreams.

2008
In January 2008, Daley won the 10m platform event at the British Championships and became the youngest winner of the senior British 10 m title. He also won the 10 m platform synchro title with new partner Blake Aldridge.

Two weeks later, Daley won his first medals on the FINA circuit, winning a bronze in the individual platform competition and a silver in synchro at the Madrid Grand Prix. Daley and Aldridge won bronze in synchro at the 2008 FINA Diving World Cup. Their score was a British record and Daley became the youngest ever male medallist in a world diving event. Daley came seventh in the individual competition. In March 2008, Daley became the youngest person to win a gold medal at the European Championships, held in Eindhoven. The previous youngest winner was the Scottish swimmer Ian Black, who won a European gold in 1958 at the age of 17.

Daley qualified for the Beijing 2008 Olympics in the individual 10m dive competition and, following the retirement of 2004 silver medallist Leon Taylor, in the 10m platform synchro competition. Some in the British media reported that in competing he would become the youngest-ever male British Olympian, until it was ascertained that Ken Lester, cox to the rowing pair at the 1960 Summer Olympics, had been 13 years and 144 days old at the time. In the Olympic synchronized 10m platform competition, they placed eighth, while in the individual 10m platform competition he finished seventh.

A month after his appearance at the Olympics, Daley participated in the FINA Junior World Championships for the first time (being too young to enter before). He finished second in the category "B" platform competition (for 14- and 15-year-old boys) with 549.60 points, between China's Qiu Bo (551.85 points) and Wu Dongliang (474.00 points). He came second in the 3-metre springboard competition in the same category with 485.25 points, sandwiched between the two Chinese divers, Wu Dongliang (510.25 points) and Wang Peng (470.40 points).

2009
In February 2009, Daley retained his individual British 10m championship, setting a competition personal best score of 517.55 points, 133.45 points ahead of the second-placed diver. He was unable to defend his 10m synchronized title, as his dive partner Blake Aldridge had been injured in a brawl at a nightclub several days before the championships and was unable to dive. In March 2009 he improved his personal best to 540.70 in coming third at a Diving World Series event in China, and the following month he improved it to 540.85 while finishing second at the World Series event in Sheffield.

During the Olympics Daley had a row with diving partner Blake Aldridge when the latter phoned his mother between rounds. When Aldridge missed the British Championships because of the injury sustained in the nightclub incident, Daley's father said he'd like his son to have a different diving partner. In April 2009 he started to dive with Max Brick, who is two years his senior, compared with the twelve-year gap with Aldridge. The pair achieved a silver medal in the 10m synchronized event at Fort Lauderdale on 8 May 2009. Daley won the individual event in a new personal best of 554.90, scoring a perfect set of seven 10s for one of his dives.

In the 2009 FINA World Championships, held in Rome, Daley unexpectedly won the individual platform title despite his lower tariff, with a score of 539.85 points, when his opponents had poor final dives – Qiu Bo finished on 532.20 points, Zhou Luxin on 530.55. In the 10 m platform synchronized event at the World Championships, Daley and Brick finished in 9th place following an inconsistent series of dives by the new pairing.

2010
In the February 2010 British Championships individual 10 m competition, Daley unveiled his 5255B dive (back two-and-a-half somersault, one-and-a-half twists, with pike) in competition for the first time, giving him a 3.6 tariff dive (reduced from 3.8 in FINAs' September 2009 DD tables). In this competition Daley finished in second place, 40.05 points behind Peter Waterfield.

In the March 2010 FINA Diving World Series event in Qingdao individual 10m competition, Daley showcased his two new dives and finished in 4th place, 520.35 points (his best score of the year).

In the first April 2010 FINA Diving World Series event held in Veracruz, Mexico, Daley failed to qualify for the final round of the individual 10m competition. A second event was held in the same venue three days later to replace the Sheffield DWS event which was cancelled because of the eruption of the Icelandic volcano Eyjafjallajökull. Daley finished in fourth place, with a score of 519.70 points – his second highest score of the season (just 0.8 points away from bronze).

In August 2010, Daley attended the European Championships in Budapest, Hungary, intending to defend his individual 10m title. However, an injury to his triceps muscle in the 10m synchro competition forced his withdrawal from the synchro and individual 10m competitions, and placed his participation in the inaugural Youth Olympics in Singapore in the following two weeks in doubt. It was later announced that Daley would dive in the 3m springboard but not in the 10m platform. Daley took part in the 3m springboard diving competition and finished in 9th place.

On 12 October 2010, Daley attended the 2010 Commonwealth Games in New Delhi, India. He and his teammate Max Brick won the gold medal for Synchronized 10m Platform Competition. The following day he also won gold in the 10m Individual Platform competition.

In November 2010, Daley was announced as a nominated sportsman for the BBC Sports Personality of the Year 2010 and the BBC Young Sports Personality of the Year 2010. He won BBC Young Sports Personality of the Year 2010 for the third time in his career, and is the first person to receive this award three times.

2011
For the 2011 season, Daley was paired in the synchronized competitions with 2004 Athens Olympic silver medallist Peter Waterfield in British Swimming's continuing efforts to find the best synchro pairing for the 2012 Olympics. At the 2011 National Cup, the British Championship was held in the new Southend Swimming and Diving Centre on 28–30 January and Daley came second in the 3m springboard competition behind Jack Laugher. With Waterfield, he won the 10m platform synchronized competition. The following day, Waterfield beat Daley to the individual 10m platform title for the second successive year, by 494.25 points to 472.35, with Max Brick third with 399.80.

In the 2011 World Championships, held in Shanghai, China, he was again paired with Waterfield in the 10m synchro event. In the week before the competition Waterfield was struck by a flu-like illness for five days, and consequently they finished in sixth place. In the individual event, Daley finished in fifth place on 505.10 points, behind Qiu Bo (585.45), David Boudia (544.25), Sascha Klein (534.50), and Viktor Minibaev (527.50).

On 27 July 2011, Daley took the first dive in London's newly built Olympic Park Aquatics Centre marking the one year countdown until the games begin. It was broadcast live on BBC One and when interviewed he said "Marking the one year to go, by diving in the Aquatics Centre is an incredible honour. Only a few years ago, this was a distant dream. The fact that I qualified at the weekend and am taking the first dive is a complete privilege. I can't wait for next year and the honour of representing Team GB."

2012
In the 2012 season, a thumb injury forced Daley's withdrawal from the National Cup a few days before the competition (the 10m platform title was won by Max Brick). In February 2012 British Diving's Performance Director Alexei Evangulov criticised Daley's work ethic, stating that he feared Daley's media and commercial activities were to the detriment of his training for the Olympics – a comment which was seemingly backed up when Daley and Pete Waterfield could only finish 7th in the 10m synchro competition in the FINA World Cup event held at the London Aquatics Centre.

Following a clear-the-air meeting between Daley, Evangulov, and Daley's representatives, Daley participated in the 2012 FINA Diving World Series. In the first event held in Dubai, Daley and Waterfield finished 4th in the 10m synchro event, while Daley won silver in the individual 10m event. In the event held in Beijing a week later, Daley and Waterfield won the silver medal in the 10m synchro event, while in the individual event Daley won silver and Waterfield the bronze. Three weeks later, in the Moscow event, Daley won silver in the individual platform event, while the pairing finished fifth in the synchro. In the final DWS meet of the year, in Tijuana, Mexico, Daley won gold in the individual platform event, and the pairing with Waterfield won bronze in the synchro event, although the Chinese did not compete in these events at this meet. Over the whole 2012 Diving World Series, Daley and the Daley/Waterfield pairing won both the overall individual and synchro 10-metre competitions.

In April 2012, Daley won the British elite juniors 10-metre platform title by a margin of 140 points at the Plymouth Life Centre.

In May 2012, Daley regained the European 10-metre platform title when he won gold at the Eindhoven championships with a score of 565.05 points, 49.65 ahead of Viktor Minibaev in silver position.

In the British Gas Diving Championships held in Sheffield in June 2012, which were also the Olympic trials, Daley and Waterfield won the 10m synchro platform title with a new British record score of 475.77, more than 140 points ahead of silver medallists Daniel Goodfellow and Ross Haslam on 333.72. In the individual 10m championship, Daley regained the title for the first time since 2009 with a score of 547.60, ahead of Peter Waterfield on 452.80 and James Denny on 390.20.

Olympics

In Britain Daley had long been considered one of the "poster boys" of the 2012 Summer Olympics, (literally – an 80-foot tall banner depicting him adorned the John Lewis department store in Cardiff, while a 40-foot tall banner of his female equivalent, heptathlete Jessica Ennis, was on the Sheffield branch of the store chain.)

It was hoped that the 10m men's synchronized platform event, on the first Monday of the Games, would provide Daley and Waterfield with an opportunity to supply Team GB's first medal of the Games. However, while the pairing was leading the competition after three dives, a poor reverse 3 1/2 somersaults with tuck in the fourth round put them out of contention and they ended the competition in fourth place on 454.65 points, behind the Chinese pairing of Cao Yuan and Zhang Yanquan on 486.78 points, the Mexican pairing of Iván García and Germán Sánchez on 468.90 points, and the US pairing of David Boudia and Nick McCrory on 463.47 points.
Following this disappointment, there was controversy when Daley was the subject of some abusive Twitter messages, which resulted in the police arresting a 17-year-old boy in Weymouth, Dorset, and a 28-year-old professional footballer for publishing offensive messages.

Returning to the Aquatics Centre on the final Friday of the Games for the 10m men's platform event, Daley initially gave his fans cause for concern with a poor performance in the preliminary round where he was ranked 15th of the 18 qualifying divers for the semi-final with 448.45 points (the eventual gold medal winner, David Boudia, ranked 18th). A much better performance in the semi-finals the next morning left Daley in fourth position on 521.10 points, behind Qiu Bo on 563.55, Lin Yue on 541.80, and Boudia on 531.15. The final round began in dramatic form when Daley's star status almost led to his undoing – a large number of camera flashes while he was diving distracted him and he only scored 75 points; a protest to the referee resulted in him being allowed to retake the dive, when he scored 91.80. By the beginning of the final round of dives in an enthralling contest, Daley was in the lead over Qiu Bo and David Boudia by 0.15 points, but Daley's final dive had a degree of difficulty of only 3.3 while his rivals both had 3.6 dives, and Daley won the bronze medal with 556.95 points while Boudia won gold with 568.65 points and Qiu Bo won silver with 566.85 points.

World Junior Diving Championships
At the 19th FINA World Junior Diving Championships, held in October 2012 in Adelaide, Australia, Daley led a strong British team and rather unexpectedly won the Boys "A" 3m synchronized springboard competition together with Jack Laugher, who had won the individual 3m competition, they had had little practice together. Daley and Laugher scored 338.85 points, over 30 points ahead of Ilia Kuzmin and Maxim Popkov.

In the 10m individual platform event, Daley won the competition with a score of 663.95, ahead of Yang Jian on 611.95 and Chen Aisen on 597.20, scoring five 10's and two 9.5's on his fifth dive.

2013
In January 2013, Daley was involved in the ITV celebrity diving show Splash!, where he was an expert adviser to the celebrity contestants. While the show got a largely negative critical response, it nevertheless got the largest ratings on each of the five Saturday nights it was broadcast, and was renewed for a second season in 2014. Daley was warned by British Swimming chief executive David Sparkes that taking part in the series would risk damaging his chances of winning an Olympic gold medal in the future.

At the British Gas Diving Championships held at his home pool in Plymouth on 8–10 February, Daley only competed in the individual 10-metre platform event, which he won with 501.00 points, ahead of James Denny on 374.90 points and Daniel Goodfellow on 340.25 points. Daley did not compete in the 10m synchro platform event, as his partner Peter Waterfield had lost his funding following this Olympiad, and his future synchro partner had yet to be determined.

Daley's participation in competitive diving in 2013 was seriously restricted by an injury in May. In April he won the 10m competition at the Edinburgh leg of the Diving World Series, but while subsequently training for the Diving Grand Prix event at Fort Lauderdale, Florida, Daley injured his elbow and was forced to withdraw from the Fort Lauderdale competition and the subsequent DWS event in Mexico. In training for the 2013 World Championships, in Barcelona, Daley suffered a torn triceps for the third time, and only competed following intense medical attention and painkilling injections; he finished the individual 10m competition in 6th place.

2014
At the beginning of 2014 Daley moved his training base from the Life Centre in Plymouth to the London Aquatics Centre at the Olympic Park in east London, with a new coach, Jane Figueiredo.

In January 2014 Daley was involved in the second series of Splash!. Ratings were not as good as the first season, and the show was cancelled.

In the FINA Diving World Series, Daley came third in the 10m platform competition at the Beijing round, scoring 525.05 points, behind China's Cao Yuan on 579.45 and Qiu Bo on 534.05 points.

In 2014 Daley hosted a six-part travel series for ITV2 called Tom Daley Goes Global.

At the 2014 Commonwealth Games in Glasgow, Daley won a silver medal in the men's synchronized 10m platform with diving partner James Denny and gold in the men's 10m platform, with 516.55 points, retaining his title from the Commonwealth Games in Delhi in 2010.

In August 2014 at the European Championships in Berlin, the Daley/Denny partnership finished fourth in the 10m platform synchro competition, in only their second competition, while Daley won the silver medal in the 10m platform competition, with 535.45 points, behind Russia's Viktor Minibaev who had 586.10 points.

2015
For the 2015 season, Daley dropped the "demon dive" (backward 2.5 somersault with 2.5 twists, piked) which he had experienced difficulty with for several years, and replaced it with a forward 3.5 somersaults with one twist, which he called his "firework" dive and displayed for the first time at the British championships in Plymouth in February.

At the British championships held in his old home pool in Plymouth, Daley won the individual 10m platform title for the fifth time, with 493.70 points, ahead of 14-year-old Matthew Dixon on 427.15, and Matty Lee on 413.20.

In the season's opening meet of the FINA Diving World Series, in Beijing, Daley conceded that the new dive still needed "work to be done" on it, as he failed to qualify for the final round. Overall, throughout the years' DWS meets, in the 10m platform competition Daley won the silver medal in the Dubai, Windsor, Ontario, and Mérida, Mexico legs, and gold in London, whilst with Alicia Blagg he won bronze in the mixed synchronized 3m springboard at Windsor and at Mérida.

At the World Championships held in Kazan, Russia, Daley won the gold medal with Rebecca Gallantree in the inaugural team event competition (Daley diving twice from the 10m platform and once from the 3m springboard, Gallantree diving once from the platform and twice from the springboard). In the individual 10m platform event he later won the bronze medal with 537.95 points, behind Qiu Bo on 587.00 and David Boudia on 560.20, having recovered from being in ninth place after the second round.

2016
For the 2016 season Daley was paired with Daniel Goodfellow for the 10m men's platform synchro competition, with a view to competing in the 2016 Rio Summer Olympics in this sport.

At the British National Diving Cup, the British Championships, held in January, Daley won a gold in the individual 10m platform competition with 545.80 points, ahead of Matty Lee on 461.00 and Dan Goodfellow on 419.35 points. In the synchronized 10m platform competition, Daley and Goodfellow won the competition, but they were the only entrants in the competition after Lee and James Denny withdrew following a power cut at the venue.

Daley and Goodfellow got bronze at the 2016 FINA Diving World Cup, earning them a spot in the 10m synchro competition at the Olympic Games.
At the 2016 FINA Diving World Series, which consisted of four competitions, Daley earned six medals. In the synchro event, he and Goodfellow medalled at each of the four competitions, earning two silver and two bronze medals. In the individual event, Daley earned a silver and a bronze medal.

At the 2016 Summer Olympics, Daley and Goodfellow won a bronze medal in the synchronized 10m platform. In the individual 10m platform, Daley placed first in the preliminaries (with an Olympic record score of 571.85 points, which was later broken by Chen Aisen in the finals). However, he had difficulties the next day, placing 18th in the semi-finals and failing to qualify for the finals.

2017
In the 2017 FINA World Series, Daley took home 1 bronze medal in Beijing (10m Platform), 3 bronze medals in Kazan (10m Platform, 10m Synchro, and 3m Mixed), and one silver medal in Guangzhou (10m Platform). On 22 July 2017 he won the gold medal in the 10m platform event at the FINA World Championships held in Budapest.

2018–2019
In the 2018 FINA Diving World Series, Daley won 1 silver medal and 1 bronze medal in Beijing (3m Mixed and 10m Synchro), 1 silver medal in Fuji (3m Mixed), 1 silver medal in Montreal (3m Mixed), and 1 silver medal in Kazan (3m Mixed).

At the 2018 Commonwealth Games held at the Gold Coast, Australia, Daley and Goodfellow won gold on the men's synchronized 10-metres platform.

Daley partnered with Matty Lee starting in October 2018 in the men's synchronized 10-metres platform. At the 2019 World Aquatics Championships held in Gwangju, South Korea, Daley and Lee finished in the bronze position in the 10m synchro.

2021
At the 2021 FINA Diving World Cup, which was held in Japan as an official test event for the 2020 Tokyo Olympics, Daley won his first World Cup gold with Matty Lee in synchronized 10m platform. He also won gold in the individual 10m platform. At the European Championships held in Budapest, Daley and Lee also won gold in synchronized 10m platform, and a silver in the individual 10m platform.

On 26 July, Daley and Lee won the 2020 Olympic gold medal in the Men's synchronized 10 m platform diving event.

On 7 August, Tom Daley qualified for the final of Men's individual 10m platform diving, improving on his performance in the individual event at Rio 2016. He went on to win bronze in the finals.

Competitive history
British champion in all events (1 m, 3 m, platform) in 2004, 2005 and 2006 in the relevant age group.

† with Blake Aldridge
§ with Max Brick
@ with Peter Waterfield
? with Jack Laugher
% with James Denny
& with Rebecca Gallantree
* with Alicia Blagg
= with Daniel Goodfellow
♠ with Grace Reid
£ with Matty Lee
** semi-final result

Daley's current dives are:

307C: Reverse 3 1/2 Somersault Tucked (3.4 Tariff)
407C: Inward 3 1/2 Somersault Tucked (3.2 Tariff)
5172B: Forward 3 1/2 Somersault w/ 1 Twist Piked (3.6 Tariff)
626B: Armstand Back Triple Somersault Piked (3.5 Tariff)
109C: Forward 4 1/2 Somersault Tucked (3.7 Tariff)
207B: Back 3 1/2 Somersault Piked (3.6 Tariff)

Personal life

Daley created a YouTube channel on 23 August 2010. His channel covers various topics such as vlogs, exercise and food. As of September 2021, Daley has over 1,200,000 subscribers with over 130 million views. On 2 December 2013, Daley released a YouTube video announcing that he had been in a relationship with a man since early that year. He said: "I've never been happier." Daley said that it had been a tough decision to speak out about his private life. He said: "I'd never felt the feeling of love, it happened so quickly, I was completely overwhelmed by it to the point I can't get him out of my head all the time." His husband is American Oscar-winning film screenwriter, director and producer Dustin Lance Black.

In the video, he did not use the words "gay" or "bisexual". He said "Of course I still fancy girls." When asked about his sexual orientation in a July 2015 interview with The Guardian, Daley said: "I don't put a particular label on any of it because right now I'm in a relationship with a guy, but I still have sexual feelings towards girls."  When asked about his coming to terms with his same-sex attraction and his relationship with Black, he said: "I'd been in relationships with girls where I'd had sexual feelings, but it became so much more intense when I met Lance." In a 2018 interview with PinkNews, Daley labelled himself as "queer", stating "I am not 100 percent straight; I am not 100 percent gay." Three years later, during a press conference after winning his first Olympic gold medal in Tokyo, he referred to  himself as a "gay man".

Daley and Black met at an industry event, with Daley later saying that it was "a real love-at-first-sight thing". He announced their engagement on 1 October 2015. Daley and Black married at Bovey Castle in Devon on 6 May 2017. On 14 February 2018, Daley announced via Instagram that he and Black were expecting their first child through surrogacy. Their son was born in June. The family lives in London. Daley and Black do not share pictures with their son's face online or on social media accounts.

Daley likes to knit and crochet, hobbies he took up after the COVID-19 pandemic lockdown began. During the 2020 Summer Olympics in Tokyo, Daley unveiled an Olympic-themed knitted cardigan he had made. Television coverage of diving events frequently showed Daley knitting, in the stands, while he watched other athletes compete. He maintains a separate Instagram account dedicated to his knitting and crochet projects.

Views
In August 2014, Daley was one of 200 public figures who were signatories to a letter to The Guardian opposing Scottish independence in the run-up to September's referendum on that issue.

In a statement made on the eve of the Commonwealth Heads of Government Meeting 2018, Daley called on Commonwealth countries to repeal their anti-gay laws. In response, the-then UK Foreign Secretary Boris Johnson told BBC Radio 1's Newsbeat that he would raise concerns about gay rights with leaders of countries where homosexuality is illegal. There have been repeated calls from the Office of the United Nations High Commissioner for Human Rights for governments to safeguard the rights of their vulnerable LGBT minorities. Prime Minister Theresa May said she "deeply regretted" Britain's historical legacy of anti-gay laws across the British Commonwealth.

In October 2021, Daley said he would make it his "mission" to campaign for countries where homosexuality is punishable by death to be banned from the next Olympics, "to make it so that the countries [where it's] punishable by death for LGBT people are not allowed to compete at the Olympic Games."

Media activities
In 2015, Daley became a patron of the LGBT+ charity Switchboard and collaborated with YouTuber Calum McSwiggan to relaunch the charity under its new name.

In October 2017, Daley hosted the Virgin Holidays Attitude Awards for the first time.

On 30 September 2018, he was the guest on BBC Radio 4's Desert Island Discs. His favourite choice was "How Long Will I Love You" by Ellie Goulding. His book choice was Harry Potter and the Philosopher's Stone by J. K. Rowling and his luxury item was an oven.

On 25 December 2021 he delivered the Alternative Christmas message for Channel 4.

Honours and awards
Daley was appointed Officer of the Order of the British Empire (OBE) in the 2022 New Year Honours for services to diving, LGBTQ+ rights and charity.
Named Youngster of the Year by BBC South West in 2005.
Named BBC South West Sports Personality of the Year, 2009.
Short-listed to the final ten for the BBC Young Sports Personality of the Year award in 2006.
Short-listed to the final three for the BBC Young Sports Personality of the Year award in 2008.
Named BBC Young Sports Personality of the Year 2007, 2009 and 2010 (only person ever to win this award more than once).
Short-listed to the final ten for the BBC Sports Personality of the Year Award in 2009 and 2010.
Ranked No. 63 in Times 2008 edition of 100 Olympic Athletes To Watch.
Won LEN Magazines "Athlete of the Year" award for men's divers, 2009, on behalf of the European Swimming Federation. The award is voted for by representatives of all European Aquatic Federations and the media.
Nominated for the 2010 Laureus World Sports Award for Breakthrough of the Year.
Included in The Sunday Times "100 Makers of the 21st Century" list.
 He was awarded an Honorary Doctorate on 27 September 2017 by the University of St Mark and St John in Plymouth, Devon.
 He was awarded the Freedom of the City of Plymouth, Devon by the Plymouth City Council on 13 September 2021.
 For the 2020 Summer Olympics, FINA named Daley winning the gold medal in the synchronized 10 metre platform event with his diving partner Matty Lee as the number three moment from the Olympic Games.

References

External links

 
 
 
 
 
 
 Plymouth Diving Club profile
 
 "Diver Daley Wins BBC Young Sports Personality 2007" – British Olympic Association
 "Tom Daley", number 63 on Times list of "100 Olympic Athletes To Watch"
 Students interview Tom Daley

1994 births
Living people
British people of Irish descent
Sportspeople from Plymouth, Devon
People educated at Plymouth College
English male divers
Divers at the 2008 Summer Olympics
Divers at the 2010 Summer Youth Olympics
Divers at the 2010 Commonwealth Games
Divers at the 2012 Summer Olympics
Divers at the 2016 Summer Olympics
Divers at the 2020 Summer Olympics
Medalists at the 2012 Summer Olympics
Medalists at the 2016 Summer Olympics
Medalists at the 2020 Summer Olympics
Divers at the 2014 Commonwealth Games
Divers at the 2018 Commonwealth Games
Olympic gold medallists for Great Britain
Olympic bronze medallists for Great Britain
Olympic divers of Great Britain
Olympic medalists in diving
Gay sportsmen
LGBT divers
English LGBT sportspeople
LGBT YouTubers
World Aquatics Championships medalists in diving
Commonwealth Games gold medallists for England
Commonwealth Games silver medallists for England
Commonwealth Games medallists in diving
English LGBT rights activists
20th-century LGBT people
21st-century LGBT people
People in knitting
Officers of the Order of the British Empire
Medallists at the 2014 Commonwealth Games
Medallists at the 2018 Commonwealth Games